Geometric and Functional Analysis (GAFA) is a mathematical journal published by Birkhäuser, an independent division of Springer-Verlag. The journal is published approximately bi-monthly.

The journal publishes papers on broad range of topics in geometry and analysis including geometric analysis, riemannian geometry, symplectic geometry, geometric group theory, non-commutative geometry, automorphic forms and analytic number theory, and others.

GAFA is both an acronym and a part of the official full name of the journal.

History

GAFA was founded in 1991 by Mikhail Gromov and Vitali Milman. The idea for the journal was inspired by the long-running Israeli seminar series "Geometric Aspects of Functional Analysis" of which Vitali Milman had been one of the main organizers in the previous years. The journal retained the same acronym as the series to stress the connection between the two.

Journal information
The journal is reviewed cover-to-cover in Mathematical Reviews and Zentralblatt MATH and is indexed cover-to-cover in the Web of Science. According to the Journal Citation Reports, the journal has a 2015 impact factor of 1.476.

The journal has four editors: Vitali Milman (editor-in-chief), Mikhail Gromov, Simon Donaldson and Peter Sarnak.

See also
Geometric analysis

References

External links
Geometric and Functional Analysis (GAFA), official journal website, Springer-Verlag
GAFA, papers to appear (at the website of the Tel-Aviv University)

Mathematics journals
Publications established in 1991
Springer Science+Business Media academic journals
English-language journals